Margaret Annabel Maule (born 8 September 1922) is a British retired actress, notable in theatre, radio, television and film. She played in several films and television series including numerous characters in Sunday Night Theatre and appeared in the TV film Wuthering Heights.

Biography 
Maule was born in Lambeth, London on 8 September 1922 to theatrical director-manager Donovan Maude and Mollie Shiells. Maule literally grew up on the stage, with her family having established there first theatre company in 1948, four years before the Kenya National Theatre, they were fundamental in helping establish the arts in Kenya.

She is the sister of actor Robin Maule (1924–1942). Maule married Douglas Dickson in Chelsea, London, in 1946, though the marriage was later dissolved. She appeared in the West End in the play His Excellency in 1950 and 1951.
 
Maule published a book, Theatre Near the Equator: The Donovan Maule Story, about her family life in 2004. She turned 100 in September 2022.

Filmography

References

External links

 

1922 births
Living people
Actresses from London
British centenarians
British stage actresses
British film actresses
British television actresses
Women centenarians